Bernd Meinunger (born 30 September 1944 in Meiningen) is a German lyricist and record producer (with Hanne Haller) who frequently works with Ralph Siegel and David Brandes. Several of his songs have represented Germany in the Eurovision Song Contest.

Selection of Works 
 "Dschinghis Khan" (with Ralph Siegel)
 "Theater" (composed by Ralph Siegel, lyrics by Bernd Meinunger)
 "Papa Pingouin" (composed by Bernd Meinunger and Ralph Siegel, lyrics by Pierre Delanoë and Jean-Paul Cara)
 "Johnny Blue" (composed by Ralph Siegel, lyrics by Bernd Meinunger)
 "Ein bißchen Frieden" (A little peace) (composed by Ralph Siegel, lyrics by Bernd Meinunger)
 "Children, Kinder, Enfants" (composed by Ralph Siegel, lyrics by Jean-Michel Beriat and Bernd Meinunger)
 "Laß die Sonne in dein Herz" (composed by Ralph Siegel, lyrics by Bernd Meinunger)
 "Lied für einen Freund" (composed by Ralph Siegel, lyrics by Bernd Meinunger)
 "Felicità" (German version of a famous Italian song composed by Dario Farina, lyrics by Bernd Meinunger)
 "Papillon" (composed by Ralph Siegel, lyrics by Bernd Meinunger and )
 "Träume sind für alle da" (Dreams are there for everyone) (composed by Ralph Siegel, lyrics by Bernd Meinunger)
 "Wir geben 'ne Party" (composed by Ralph Siegel, lyrics by Bernd Meinunger)
 "Zeit" (composed by Ralph Siegel, lyrics by Bernd Meinunger)
 "Reise nach Jerusalem - Kudüs'e seyahat" (composed by Ralph Siegel, lyrics by Bernd Meinunger)
 "I Can't Live Without Music" (composed by Ralph Siegel, lyrics by Bernd Meinunger)
 "Let's Get Happy" (composed by Ralph Siegel, lyrics by Bernd Meinunger)
 "Cool Vibes" (composed by David Brandes and Petra Brändle (a.k.a. Jane Tempest), lyrics by Bernd Meinunger (a.k.a. John O'Flynn))
 "Run & Hide" (composed by David Brandes and Petra Brändle (a.k.a. Jane Tempest), lyrics by Bernd Meinunger (a.k.a. John O'Flynn))
 "If We All Give a Little" (composed by Ralph Siegel, lyrics by Bernd Meinunger)
 "Just Get Out of My Life" (composed by Ralph Siegel, lyrics by Bernd Meinunger and José Juan Santana Rodriguez)

Eurovision Song Contest participations

References

External links

1944 births
German songwriters
German record producers
Eurovision Song Contest winners
Germany in the Eurovision Song Contest
Living people